Skåtøy Church is a parish church of the Church of Norway in Kragerø Municipality in Vestfold og Telemark county, Norway. It is located on the island of Skåtøy which is located in the skerries just offshore from the town of Kragerø. It is the church for the Skåtøy parish which is part of the Bamble prosti (deanery) in the Diocese of Agder og Telemark. The white, wooden church was built in a long church design in 1862 using plans drawn up by the architects Heinrich Ernst Schirmer and Wilhelm von Hanno. The church seats about 600 people.

The church is sometimes nicknamed the Cathedral of the Skerries. This historical site is reachable by boat and recalls Kragerø's "golden days".  The surrounding 500 islands were the home of farmers, fishermen, lumberjacks and sailors from the 17th century. It is one of the largest churches in Norway built of wood, with seats for 600 people. It was considered the most important church in the region until around 1960.

History

During the 19th century there were demands for a local church on the island of Skåtøy. In 1851, a cemetery was consecrated for local use. Nearly ten years later, approval was given to build a church at the cemetery. Heinrich Ernst Schirmer and Wilhelm von Hanno were hired to design the new church. The church was consecrated on 5 September 1862 by the provost of Bamble prosti when Bishop Jacob von der Lippe was unable to attend. The building is a wooden long church. There was a major refurbishment for the jubilee in 1912, and in 1914 the bell tower was rebuilt. In 1918, a new altarpiece was installed and it was painted by Julie Gjessing. The motif is from the Gospel of Mark 1:35 ("Early the next morning, while it was still dark, Jesus got up, went out and went to a deserted place, and prayed there") and portrayed Jesus in prayer. There was renovation in 1930 and again in 1954. In winter when there is often lower attendance, a smaller room called the Winter Church is used on the 2nd floor behind the organ gallery.

See also
List of churches in Agder og Telemark

References

Kragerø
Churches in Vestfold og Telemark
Long churches in Norway
Wooden churches in Norway
19th-century Church of Norway church buildings
Churches completed in 1862
1862 establishments in Norway